Events from the year 1709 in Canada.

Incumbents
French Monarch: Louis XIV
British and Irish Monarch: Anne

Governors
Governor General of New France: Philippe de Rigaud Vaudreuil
Governor of Acadia: Daniel d'Auger de Subercase
Colonial Governor of Louisiana: Jean-Baptiste Le Moyne de Bienville
Governor of Plaisance: Philippe Pastour de Costebelle

Events
 In New France, slavery becomes legal.

Births
 September 7 (O.S. September 18 - Dr. Samuel Johnson born in Lichfield, Staffordshire. (died 1784)
 September 26 - Jean-Louis Le Loutre, priest, Spiritan, and missionary (died 1772)

Deaths
 August - Robert Giguère, pioneer in New France and founder of Sainte-Anne-de-Beaupré (born 1616)
 September 9 - Jean-Baptiste Legardeur de Repentigny (born 1632)

Historical documents
Intendant's ordinance proclaims Panis and Blacks who have been purchased are property to be known as slaves (Note: "savages" used)

"Inhabitants remaining[...]are in a very bad condition" - Report to Queen Anne of aftermath of French attack on St. John's, Newfoundland

"Rotten and decay'd" - Indigenous spies sent by New York government report Canadian fortifications (except at Quebec City) are poor

"So great a plague to all Plantations in America" - New Englanders eager to attack Port Royal and its "nest of spoilers and robbers"

Inhabitants of Buoys Island (off Ferryland, Newfoundland) get evacuation offer but stay to meet possible third French attack

References 

 
Canada
09